Jean Degaudenzi (born 18 September 1944) is a Swiss sailor. He competed in the Flying Dutchman event at the 1972 Summer Olympics.

References

External links
 

1944 births
Living people
Swiss male sailors (sport)
Olympic sailors of Switzerland
Sailors at the 1972 Summer Olympics – Flying Dutchman
Place of birth missing (living people)